The 2000 West Virginia Mountaineers football team represented West Virginia University in the 2000 NCAA Division I-A football season. The 2000 season was also Don Nehlen's final one in his coaching career.  The Mountaineers finished the season 7–5, capped by a victory over Ole Miss in the Music City Bowl. The victory snapped the program's eight-game losing streak in bowl games.

Schedule

References

West Virginia
West Virginia Mountaineers football seasons
West Virginia Mountaineers football